Biljana Coković (Cokovik) (born 30 July 1982 in Skopje - died 5 September 2007 in Bartow, Florida) was a Macedonian swimmer. She competed in the 10 km event in 1st FINA World Open Water Swimming Championships and took 15th place.
She died in a car accident.

References
Site dedicated to her
Site about her accident

1982 births
2007 deaths
Female long-distance swimmers
Macedonian female swimmers
Road incident deaths in Florida
Sportspeople from Skopje
Macedonian people of Serbian descent